Mount Pisgah is a mountain located in the Catskill Mountains of New York north of Windham. Steenburg Mountain is located northwest, Richtmyer Peak is located west, and Mount Nebo is located southeast of Mount Pisgah.

References

Pisgah
Pisgah